Joshua Luke Rojas (born June 30, 1994) is an American professional baseball utility player for the Arizona Diamondbacks of Major League Baseball (MLB).

Amateur career
Rojas attended Millennium High School in Goodyear, Arizona and played college baseball at Paradise Valley Community College and the University of Hawaii. In 2015, he played collegiate summer baseball with the Cotuit Kettleers of the Cape Cod Baseball League. In 2017, his senior year at Hawaii, he hit .294 with five home runs and 25 RBIs in fifty games.

Professional career

Houston Astros
After the season, he was drafted by the Houston Astros in the 26th round of the 2017 Major League Baseball draft.

Rojas made his professional debut with the Quad Cities River Bandits and also played in four games for the Fresno Grizzlies. In 56 games for the year, he hit .261 with ten home runs and forty RBIs. He played 2018 with the Buies Creek Astros and Corpus Christi Hooks, earning Texas League All-Star honors. In 130 total games between both teams, he slashed .263/.351/.408 with eight home runs, 55 RBIs, and 38 stolen bases. He started 2019 with Corpus Christi before being promoted to the Round Rock Express.

Arizona Diamondbacks
On July 31, 2019, Rojas was traded to the Arizona Diamondbacks (along with Corbin Martin, Seth Beer, and J. B. Bukauskas) and cash considerations in exchange for Zack Greinke.

On August 12, 2019, the Diamondbacks selected Rojas' contract and promoted him to the major leagues. He made his major league debut that night versus the Colorado Rockies. In 2020, Rojas slashed .180/.257/.180 in 17 games before ending the season on the injured list due to a lower back injury. Improved in the 2021 season, as he slashed .264/.341/.411 across 139 games, as he served in a utility role for the Diamondbacks.

References

External links

1994 births
Living people
Sportspeople from Glendale, Arizona
Baseball players from Arizona
Major League Baseball outfielders
Major League Baseball infielders
Arizona Diamondbacks players
Hawaii Rainbow Warriors baseball players
Cotuit Kettleers players
Quad Cities River Bandits players
Buies Creek Astros players
Corpus Christi Hooks players
Fresno Grizzlies players
Round Rock Express players
Reno Aces players